Francisco Javier Dorado Bielsa (born 17 February 1977) is a Spanish retired professional footballer who played as a left-back.

Club career
Dorado was born in Talavera de la Reina, Province of Toledo. Brought through the ranks of La Liga powerhouse Real Madrid, he played two league matches for the first team during the 1999–2000 season, the first being a 1–1 away draw against Valencia CF on 20 February 2000; his competitive debut was also against Valencia, in a 6–0 loss for the Copa del Rey also at the Mestalla Stadium. He was included in Real's squad for the 2000 FIFA Club World Championship, where he missed one of the penalties in the third-place playoff that was lost to Club Necaxa following a shootout. After that, he had Segunda División loan stints with UD Salamanca and Sporting de Gijón.

In 2002–03, Dorado returned to Madrid and the top flight, also playing as backup with Rayo Vallecano. The following campaign he returned to Gijón as the undisputed first-choice, going on to compete in the second tier a further three years.

In July 2006, Dorado joined RCD Mallorca on a one-year contract, but would be virtually absent from the team's lineups during his spell, blocked by ex-FC Barcelona and future Spain international Fernando Navarro. He was released by the Balearic Islands club in July 2008 following an anterior cruciate ligament injury, with only seven competitive appearances to his credit.

References

External links

1977 births
Living people
People from Talavera de la Reina
Sportspeople from the Province of Toledo
Spanish footballers
Footballers from Castilla–La Mancha
Association football defenders
La Liga players
Segunda División players
Segunda División B players
Real Madrid C footballers
Real Madrid Castilla footballers
Real Madrid CF players
UD Salamanca players
Sporting de Gijón players
Rayo Vallecano players
RCD Mallorca players
CD Atlético Baleares footballers
Spain under-21 international footballers